The Republic of India recognised Ukraine as a sovereign country in December 1991 following the dissolution of the Soviet Union & established diplomatic relations in January 1992. The Indian Embassy in Kyiv was opened in May 1992 and Ukraine opened its Mission in New Delhi in February 1993. The Consulate General of India in Odessa functioned from 1962 until its closure in March 1999. Ukraine is India's second largest trade partner after Russia in the former Soviet Union.

History

Bilateral treaties and agreements 
More than 17 bilateral agreements have been signed between India and Ukraine, including agreements on Co-operation in Science and Technology, Foreign Office Consultation, Co-operation in Space Research, Avoidance of Double Taxation and Promotion and Protection of Investments. During Aero India 2021, Ukraine signed four agreements worth  with India which includes sale of new weapons as well as maintenance and upgrades of existing ones in service with the Indian armed forces.

Trade relations 
The India-Ukraine trade relation and economic co-operation has developed on the basis the long-standing friendship between the two countries. In March, 1992 the Treaty on Friendship and Co-operation was signed between India and Ukraine, providing a major boost to India-Ukraine trade relations.

India Ukraine trade relations have been developing at a very fast pace. There has been a threefold increase in the India Ukraine trade during 2003-2005 and it has exceeded US$1 billion. Ukraine imports from India have doubled and stand at US$3,214 million in 2006, while Ukraine exports to India have increased by 3.6 times and stands at US$7,369 million in 2006. The total turnover in India-Ukraine trade during 2005-2006 has exceeded US$3.1 billion (as of January, 2014). The main items being imported by Ukraine from India are drugs, pharmaceutical production, ores and minerals, tobacco products, tea, coffee, spices, silk and jute. The main items imported by India from Ukraine are chemicals, equipment, machines and engines. Bilateral trade between the two countries has  grown  significantly in  the last 25 years and in 2018–19, was  almost US$2.8 Billion. India is Ukraine's largest export  destination in the Asia-Pacificand the fifth largest overall export destination. 

Both the Ukrainian and Indian governments take part in the sessions of the Ukraine Indian Inter-Governmental Commission which hold the Joint Business Council Meeting of Ukraine-India. This has given a major boost to India Ukraine trade relations. Ukraine is not a new member in the Indian industry as its enterprises are actively involved and form the backbone of Indian power sector and heavy industries among others.

There are such joint stock companies as 'Ukrindustry' that has won contracts for conducting coke battery reconstruction at the plants of metallurgy in Rourkela and Bokaro. There are also Azovmash and Novokramatorskyi machine building plants that supply oxygen converter manufacturing equipment. India-Ukraine trade relations has also been successful in increasing co-operation between the two countries in technology and scientific field.

Science and technology relations 
Under the Agreement signed between India and Ukraine in May 1992, the Joint S&T Committee meets annually to discuss implementation of projects, holding of exhibitions and co-operation in scientific research. The Committee last met in Kyiv in October 2007 and approved 11 S&T projects for implementation. Days of Ukrainian Science and Technology were held in New Delhi in December 2004. National Space Agency of Ukraine and ISRO have ongoing co-operation in the space sector. Ukraine has a very strong IT Sector. Many offshore call centres have been successful. Aptech Limited from Mumbai has signed an Agreement in May 2004 with International Institute of Personnel Management (the biggest IT training centre in Ukraine) to organise IT programmes for schools and institutions in Ukraine. Bio-technology is the latest sector where companies such as Biocon, Genome etc. are co-operating with each other. It also supplies turbines for thermal, hydroelectric and nuclear power plants.

In 2005, then President A. P. J. Abdul Kalam expressed interest in strengthening co-operation with Ukraine in the field of space research during a speech given to Indians in Ukraine. He and members of the Indian Space Research Organisation (ISRO) later visited the Ukrainian space agency Yuzhnoye, one of the largest rocket manufacturing units in the world.

Political relations 

India has had friendly relations with Ukraine even when the latter was a republic part of the Soviet Union. Annual Foreign Office consultations are held at Secretary level. The Deputy Foreign Minister in charge of the Asia region represents the Ukrainian side in these consultations. Ukraine has been positively co-operating with India at the international level also. Ukraine supports the resolution of the issue of Jammu & Kashmir on the basis of bilateral Simla agreement by India and Pakistan. Ukraine also supports reforms of the UN structure.

During the Russian invasion of Ukraine in 2022, Indian media started reporting that in 1998 Ukraine had opposed India's nuclear test and wrongly reported that Ukraine voted in favor of UN Resolution 1172 which condemned India's nuclear test at United Nations Security Council. However, Ukraine was not a member country of UN Security Council when Resolution 1172 was unanimously passed, therefore it could not have participated in the voting process and Resolution 1172 also did not contain any sanction.

Ukraine was, however, a member of the Conference on Disarmament where Mykola Maimeskul, the Permanent Representative of Ukraine to the United Nations, had condemned the nuclear testing by India. The Permanent Representative of Ukraine to the United Nations, Volodymyr Yelchenko, further condemned India for testing nuclear weapons in a special additional statement.

Position on Crimea 
After the Russian annexation of Crimea in 2014, India abstained from a resolution condemning it. India also does not support Western sanctions against Russia. In December 2014, Prime Minister of Crimea, Sergey Aksyonov, made an unofficial visit to India to sign a memorandum with a business group called the Indian-Crimean Partnership. India's Ministry of External Affairs spokesman said that he was not officially aware of the visit by Mr. Aksyonov. The spokesman also said that Mr. Aksyonov was not a member of Putin's delegation. However, some experts have expressed scepticism regarding the explanation offered by India's Ministry of External Affairs spokesman. Ukraine president criticised India for allowing Sergey Aksyonov to visit India. U.S. State Department spokeswoman, Jen Psaki, also expressed concerns regarding the visit.

In November 2020, India, along with 22 other countries, voted against a Ukraine-sponsored resolution in the United Nations condemning alleged human rights violations by Russia in Crimea.

Position on 2022 Russian invasion of Ukraine
Throughout the Russian invasion of Ukraine, India had maintained a neutral stance and abstained from voting in support of several resolutions aimed at condemning Russia's actions in Ukraine, both at United Nations General Assembly and at United Nations Security Council. India was one of three countries on the UN Security Council to abstain from voting on the resolution to condemn the 2022 Russian invasion of Ukraine, which ultimately failed due to a veto from permanent member Russia. India has also abstained from voting in support of resolutions demanding probe into Russia's human right violations in Ukraine and the resolution aimed at terminating Russia's membership to United Nations Human Rights Council. Russia, in turn, has also praised India from abstaining on resolutions aimed at Russia and termed India's position as "balanced and independent".

Government of India had also refused to condemn Russia's invasion of Ukraine and termed India-Russia friendship "unbreakable". Following the invasion of Ukraine, India doubled down on buying large amount of Russian oil at discounted price and continued placing order for Russian-made weapons. This made Russia the 3rd largest oil supplier to India in 2022. In 2021, Russia was at the 17th spot, supplying only about 1 percent of India’s overall oil imports. From April 2022 to January 2023, India's Russian import rose by 384%, mainly driven by increased import of Russian oil. Ukrainian Foreign Minister Dmytro Kuleba criticized India for profiting from buying cheap Russian oil. On 29 December 2022, following the Russian strikes against Ukrainian infrastructure, Kuleba tweeted, "There can be no ‘neutrality’ in the face of such mass war crimes. Pretending to be ‘neutral’ equals taking Russia’s side."

Sanctions 
Oleksandr Merezhko, a senior Ukrainian lawmaker and a top aide to Volodymyr Zelenskyy, while on a visit to Washington, had requested United States to impose sanctions on India and China if they continue buying oil from Russia.

Protest against transfer of ammunition to Ukraine 
On 2 September 2022, The Economic Times reported that India has strongly raised objection against the transfer of Pakistan's manufactured arms and ammunition to Ukraine through Royal Air Force's aircraft with the government of United Kingdom.

Indian Community

A small but vibrant Indian community lives in Ukraine, composed mostly of business professionals and students. There are about 18,000 Indian students studying in Ukraine, mainly in the field of medicine. Indian business professionals work predominantly in the fields of pharmaceuticals, IT, engineering, medicine, and education. The ‘India Club’, founded by Indian expats in 2001, actively engages the Indian diaspora in Ukraine and organises several events - such as a Diwali festival, cricket tournaments, a Holi festival, Indian dance festival, screenings of Bollywood movies, etc. 

On March 4 2022, India asked Ukraine and Russia to enforce a truce in the northeastern Ukrainian city of Sumy to allow hundreds of Indian students besieged there to be evacuated as the situation worsened.

See also 
 Indian Embassy in Ukraine
 Foreign relations of India
 Foreign relations of Ukraine

References

External links 
  UkraineIndia.org
  Indian embassy in Kyiv
  Ukrainian embassy in New Delhi
 India-Ukraine Foreign Relations

 
Ukraine
Bilateral relations of Ukraine